Group C of the 2015 Copa América was one of the three groups of competing nations in the 2015 Copa América. It consisted of Brazil, Colombia, Peru, and Venezuela. Group play began on 14 June 2015 and ended on 21 June 2015.

Brazil, Peru and Colombia advanced to the quarter-finals.

Teams

Notes

Standings

In the quarter-finals:
Brazil advanced to play Paraguay (runners-up of Group B).
Peru advanced to play Bolivia (runners-up of Group A).
Colombia (as one of the two best third-placed teams) advanced to play Argentina (winners of Group B).

Matches
All times local, CLT (UTC−3).

Colombia vs Venezuela

Brazil vs Peru

Brazil vs Colombia

Peru vs Venezuela

Colombia vs Peru

Brazil vs Venezuela

References

External links
 (Official website) 
Copa América 2015, CONMEBOL.com 

Group C
Group
2015 in Peruvian football
2015 in Colombian football
Group